The different kinds of bows one could encounter at an Eastern Orthodox service are shown in the drawing below.

Strict rules exist as to which type of a bow should be used at any particular time. The rules are very complicated, and are not always carried out in most parishes. Old Believers are generally much more punctilious about bows in comparison with the official Orthodoxy.

 The first type is a 'head-only bow'. This type of bow does not have its own assigned usage, but can be used only instead of a 'belt-low bow' (2) in some situations, such as when one cannot make a lower bow because of too many people in the church or for back problems. People also should keep standing in this position during reading of Gospels and some other important periods of the service.
 'Belt-low bow' (поясной поклон) can also be called an 'ordinary bow', since it is the most widespread type of bow. Most bows during the Eastern Orthodox service are of this kind. However, sometimes, for example, during the Lent, the bows became lower and 'earth-low bows' (5) should be used instead. 
 'Belt-low bow with touching earth by a hand'. This type of a bow could be treated in two ways: sometimes it is only the 'very thoroughly done type 2 bow'. Sometimes, on the other hand, it is a 'lightened' version of an 'earth-low bow' (5). For example, when Popovtsy Old Believers ask their priests for a blessing, they should, theoretically, perform an 'earth-low bow'. However, since one could ask a priest for a blessing during an occasional meeting on a street, where it is rather uncomfortable to make a full 'earth-low bow', usually one only touches the earth with one's right hand (usually the back side of a hand).
 Metania (метание, 'metanie') is also a 'lightened' version of an 'earth-low bow' that is used in Eastern Orthodox services sometimes.
 Zemnoy poklon (земной поклон, full earth-low bow) is a special type of bow which is especially important for Old Believers. It is also performed by the priest and many of the congregation during the epiclesis.

Kneeling, standing on one's knees, is rarely prescribed or practiced. An exception is that the ordinand "bending both knees places his palms in the form of a Cross, and lays his forehead between them on the Holy Table" when a bishop is consecrated or a priest is ordained.

In the 20th century in some western countries, some Eastern Orthodox churches have begun to use pews and kneelers and so have begun kneeling in some parts of the service.

The First Council of Nicaea's decree "that prayer be made to God standing" from Pascha (Easter) through Pentecost, and on all Sundays throughout the year, in honour of the Resurrection is strictly observed, excepting only for prostrating before the Cross on the Third Sunday of Great Lent and on the Feast of the Exaltation of the Cross, if it falls on a Sunday, as well as for a few sacramental services, e.g., ordinations.

However, the Russian Old Rite, which reflects the praxis of the Russian church prior to the 17th-century reforms, which brought it in line with Greek practice as it stood at the time, itself the result of revision over the centuries, explicitly requires prostrations to be made at certain points during the services regardless of whether it is a Sunday, including at the end of Shine, Shine throughout the paschal season.

See also 
 Dogeza
 Genuflection
 Kowtow
 Podruchnik
 Sign of the cross
 Sujud

References

External links
 Why are Prayers Said Without Kneeling On All Sundays and From Pascha Until Pentecost? Orthodox Information Center

Eastern Orthodox liturgy
Old Believer movement
Gestures of respect
Kneeling
Bowing